Prakash Kona Reddy (born 1967) is an Indian novelist, essayist, poet and theorist who lives in Hyderabad, India. He is currently a professor at the Department of English Literature, School of English Literary Studies, The English and Foreign Languages University (EFLU), Hyderabad.

He writes in English, and is the author of the many books to date.

Bibliography 
Conjurer of Nights
How I Invented Myself as "Prakash Kona"
Nunc Stans [Creative Non-fiction: 2009, CROSSING CHAOS enigmatic ink, Ontario, Canada]
Words on Lips of a Stranger [2005, Writers Workshop, Calcutta]
Pearls of an Unstrung Necklace [Fiction: 2005, Fugue State Press, New York]
Literary Criticism: A Study of Pluralism (Wittgenstein, Chomsky and Derrida) [Theory: 2004, Wisdom House Publications, Leeds, England]
Streets that Smell of Dying Roses
Poems for Her (as Kona Prakash Reddy)* [Poetry: 1999, Writers Workshop, Calcutta]
You and Other Poems (as Kona Prakash Reddy)* [Poetry: 1997, Writers Workshop, Calcutta]
Other works, including essays and fictional vignettes, are published widely on the Internet.

In August 2010 Kona contributed to an eBook collection of political poems entitled Emergency Verse - Poetry in Defence of the Welfare State edited by Alan Morrison.

Themes 
His fiction is highly unusual, an experimental combination of free-floating emotion and political theory that can depict, for example, a city or a love relationship in an ambiguous, flowing, non-concrete and yet highly personal and heartfelt manner.

References

1967 births
Living people
Indian male essayists
Indian male novelists
Indian male poets
20th-century Indian novelists
Indian postmodern writers
20th-century Indian poets
20th-century Indian essayists
Writers from Hyderabad, India
20th-century Indian male writers